Noor Jehan (born Allah Rakhi Wasai ; 23 September 1926 – 23 December 2000; sometimes spelled Noorjehan), also known by her honorific title Malika-e-Tarannum (Queen of Melody), was a Punjabi playback singer and actress who worked first in India and then in the cinema of Pakistan. Her career spanned more than six decades (the 1930s–1990s). Considered to be one of the greatest and most influential singers in Indian subcontinent, she was given the honorific title of Malika-e-Tarannum in Pakistan. She had a command of Hindustani classical music as well as other music genres.

Along with Ahmed Rushdi, she holds the record for having given voice to the largest number of film songs in the history of Pakistani cinema. She recorded about 20,000 songs in various languages including Urdu, Hindi, Punjabi and Sindhi. She sang a total of 2,422 songs in 1148 Pakistani films during a career that lasted more than half a century. She is also considered to be the first female Pakistani film director.

Early life
Noor Jehan was born as Allah Rakhi Wasai into a Punjabi Muslim family in Kasur, Punjab, British India and was one of the eleven children of Imdad Ali and Fateh Bibi.

Career

Career in British India

Jehan began to sing at the age of six and showed a keen interest in a range of styles, including traditional folk and popular theatre. Realising her potential for singing, her father sent her to receive early training in classical singing under Ustad Ghulam Mohammad. He started her training at age of 11 at Calcutta and instructed her in the traditions of the Patiala Gharana of Hindustani classical music and the classical forms of thumri, dhrupad, and khyal.

At the age of nine, Noor Jehan drew the attention of Punjabi musician Ghulam Ahmed Chishti, who would later introduce her to the stage in Lahore. He composed some ghazals, na`ats and folk songs for her to perform, although she was keener on breaking into acting or playback singing. Once her vocational training finished, Jehan pursued a career in singing alongside her sister in Lahore, and would usually take part in the live song and dance performances prior to screenings of films in cinemas.

Theatre owner Diwan Sardari Lal took the small girl to Calcutta in the early 1930s and the entire family moved to Calcutta in hopes of developing the movie careers of Allah Wasai and her older sisters, Eiden Bai and Haider Bandi. Mukhtar Begum (not to be confused with actress Sabiha Khanum) encouraged the sisters to join film companies and recommended them to various producers. She also recommended them to her husband, Agha Hashar Kashmiri, who owned a maidan theatre (a tented theatre to accommodate large audiences). It was here that Wasai received the stage name, Baby Noor Jehan. Her older sisters were offered jobs with one of the Seth Sukh Karnani companies, Indira Movietone and they went on to be known as the Punjab Mail.

In 1935, K.D. Mehra directed the Punjabi movie Pind di Kuri in which Noor Jehan acted along with her sisters and sang the Punjabi song "Langh aja patan chanaan da o yaar", which became her earliest hit. She then acted in a film called Missar Ka Sitara (1936) by the same company and sang in it for music composer Damodar Sharma. Jehan also played the child role of Heer in the film Heer-Sayyal (1937). One of her popular songs from that period "Shala jawaniyan maney" is from Dalsukh Pancholi's Punjabi film Gul Bakawli (1939). All these Punjabi movies were made in Calcutta. After a few years in Calcutta, Jehan returned to Lahore in 1938. In 1939, renowned music director Ghulam Haider composed songs for Jehan which led to her early popularity, and he thus became her early mentor.

In 1942, she played the main lead opposite Pran in Khandaan (1942). It was her first role as an adult, and the film was a major success. The success of Khandaan saw her shifting to Bombay, with the director Syed Shaukat Hussain Rizvi. She shared melodies with Shanta Apte in Duhai (1943). It was in this film that Jehan lent her voice for the second time, to another actress named Husn Bano. She married Rizvi later the same year. From 1945 to 1947 and her subsequent move to Pakistan, Noor Jehan was one of the biggest film actresses of the Indian Film Industry. Her films: Badi Maa, Zeenat, Gaon Ki Gori (all 1945), Anmol Ghadi (1946), Mirza Sahiban (1947) and Jugnu (1947) were the top-grossing films of the years 1945 to 1947.
Mirza Sahiban was her last film released in India in which she was paired opposite Trilok Kapoor, brother of Prithviraj Kapoor.

Acting career in Pakistan
In 1947, Rizvi and Jehan decided to move to Pakistan. They left Bombay and settled in Karachi with their family.

Three years after settling in Pakistan, Jehan starred in her first Pakistani film Chan Wey (1951), opposite Santosh Kumar, which was also her first Pakistani film as a heroine and playback singer. Shaukat Hussain Rizvi and Noor Jehan directed this film together, making Jehan Pakistan's first female director. It became the highest-grossing film in Pakistan in 1951. Jehan's second film in Pakistan was Dupatta (1952) which was produced by Aslam Lodhi, directed by Sibtain Fazli and assisted by A. H. Rana as production manager. Dupatta turned out to be an even bigger success than Chan Wey (1951).

During 1953 and 1954, Jehan and Rizvi had problems and got divorced due to personal differences. She kept custody of the three children from their marriage. In 1959, she married another film actor, Ejaz Durrani, nine years her junior. Durrani pressured her to give up acting, and her last film as an actress/singer was Ghalib (1961). This contributed to the strengthening of her iconic stature. She gained another audience for herself. Her rendition of Faiz Ahmed Faiz's "Mujhse Pehli Si Mohabbat Mere Mehboob Na Maang" is a unique example of tarranum, reciting poetry as a song with music of Rasheed Attre in the Pakistani film Qaidi (1962). Jehan last acted in Baaji in 1963, though not in a leading role.

Jehan bade farewell to film acting in 1963 after a career of 33 years (1930–1963). The pressure of being a mother of six children and the demands of being a wife to another fellow film actor, forced her to give up her career. Jehan made 14 films in Pakistan, ten in Urdu and four in Punjabi as a film actress.

As playback singer
After quitting acting she took up playback singing. She made her debut exclusively as a playback singer in 1960 with the film Salma. Her first initial playback singing for a Pakistani film was for the 1951 film Chann Wey, for which she was the film director herself. She received many awards, including the Pride of Performance in 1965 by the Pakistani Government. She sang a large number of duets with Ahmed Rushdi, Mehdi Hassan, Masood Rana, Nusrat Fateh Ali Khan and Mujeeb Aalam.

She had an understanding and friendship with many singers of Asia, for example with Alam Lohar and many more. Jehan made great efforts to attend the "Mehfils" (live concerts) of Ustad Salamat Ali Khan, Ustad Fateh Ali Khan, Ustad Nusrat Fateh Ali Khan and Roshan Ara Begum. Lata Mangeshkar commented on Jehan's vocal range, that Jehan could sing as low and as high as she wanted, and that the quality of her voice always remained the same. Singing was, for Jehan, not effortless but an emotionally and physically draining exercise. In the 1990s, Jehan also sang for then débutante actresses Neeli and Reema. For this very reason, Sabiha Khanum affectionately called her Sadabahar (evergreen). Her popularity was further boosted with her patriotic songs during the 1965 war between Pakistan and India.

In 1971 Madam Noor Jehan visited Tokyo for the World Song Festival as a representative from Pakistan.

Jehan visited India in 1982 to celebrate the Golden Jubilee of the Indian talkie movies, where she met Indian Prime Minister Indira Gandhi in New Delhi and was received by Dilip Kumar and Lata Mangeshkar in Bombay. She met all her erstwhile heroes and costars, including Surendra, Pran, Suraiya, composer Naushad and others. The website  Women on Record  stated: "Noor Jehan injected a degree of passion into her singing unmatched by anyone else. But she left for Pakistan".

In 1991, Vanessa Redgrave invited her to perform at a fundraising event to benefit the children of the Middle East held at Royal Albert Hall London. Lionel Richie, Bob Geldof, Madonna, Boy George, and Duran Duran were some of the performers at the star-studded event which was attended, amongst many others, by thespian John Gielgud, Nobel Prize-winning playwright Harold Pinter, and Oscar-winning actor Dame Peggy Ashcroft. She has also sung "Saiyan Saadey Naal", a song of well-known Pakistani folk singer, songwriter and composer Akram Rahi for the film Dam Mast Kalander/Aalmi Gunday.

Personal life
In 1942, Noor Jehan married Shaukat Hussain Rizvi of Azamgarh, Uttar Pradesh, India. In 1947, Shaukat Rizvi decided to migrate to Pakistan, and Noor Jehan moved too, ending her career in India. She next visited India only in 1982. Her marriage to Rizvi ended in 1953 with a divorce; the couple had three children, including their singer daughter Zil-e-Huma.

Noor Jehan was also in a relationship with cricketer Nazar Mohammad. She married Ejaz Durrani in 1959. The second marriage also produced three children but also ended in divorce in 1971. She was also married to actor Yousuf Khan.

Last years and death

Jehan suffered from chest pains in 1986 on a tour of North America and was diagnosed with angina pectoris, after which she underwent bypass surgery. According to her daughter, Shazia Hassan, she was suffering from chronic kidney disease in her last years and was on dialysis. In 2000, Jehan was hospitalised at Aga Khan University Hospital, Karachi, and suffered a heart attack. On 23 December 2000 (night of 27 Ramadan), Jehan died as a result of heart failure. Her funeral took place at Jamia Masjid Sultan, Karachi and was attended by over 400,000 people. She was buried at the Gizri Graveyard in Karachi. When she died, then President of Pakistan Pervez Musharraf said that "She deserves a state funeral". He ordered her funeral be taken to Lahore from Karachi, but her daughters insisted on burying her in Karachi on the night she died. In the wake of her death, a famous Indian writer and poet, Javed Akhtar, in an interview in Mumbai, said that "In the worst conditions of our relations with Pakistan in 53 years, in a very hostile atmosphere, our cultural heritage has been a common bridge. Noor Jehan was one such durable bridge. My fear is that her death may have shaken it."

Awards and honours
Noor Jehan received more than 15 Nigar Awards for Best Female Playback Singer, eight for Best Urdu Singer Female and the rest for Punjabi Playback. She has also received the Millennium Singer Award in Pakistan.
In 1945, for the film Zeenat, she was awarded a gold medal by Z.A Bukhari.
Noor Jehan was ranked eighth in a list of Most Influential Pakistanis.
Mohammad Rafi always wished to make duets with her. Asha Bhosle, a Bollywood playback singer, stated in an interview:
Jehan was one of my favourite singers and when I listened to her Ghazals, I realized how unusual compositions were those, so I decided to take them to a larger audience which they deserve.
She added that;
The world will never see a singer like her. Just as people have not seen another Mohammad Rafi and Kishore Kumar there would never be another Noor Jehan. 
British Weekly Newspaper Eastern Eye ranked Noor Jehan at 16th in a list of 20 Bollywood singers of all time. The entertainment editor of Eastern Eye wrote that;
Jehan was the first female singing star of the Indian cinema and helped to lay the foundation of playback singing as we know it. She inspired a generation of singers including Lata Mangeshkar before single-handedly kick-starting music In Pakistan and inspired subsequent generations there.

In 1945, she became the first woman in the subcontinent to sing Qawwali in the film Zeenat. American Queen of Pop Madonna commented that, "I can copy every singer but not Noor Jehan".
In 1957, she received President's Award for her acting and singing in film Intezar. It was the same film for which Khwaja Khurshid Anwar also received President's Award for Best Music Director.
In 1965, she received Special Nigar Award for her wartime songs.
In 1965, she was awarded Pride of Performance by the President of Pakistan for her singing and acting capabilities.
She became the Second Pakistani Female Vocalist after Roshan Ara Begum to receive Pride of Performance.
In 1965, she received Tamgha-e-Imtiaz from the army for her moral support in the Indo-Pak war.
In 1972, she received Silver Disc Award for Best Ghazal Singer followed by Farida Khanum and Roshan Ara Begum was the first to receive the award.
She was the only Pakistani singer to sing with the Egyptian singer Umm Kulthum.
In 1981, she received Special Nigar Award for her excellence in 30 years of her career in Pakistan.
In 1987, she received NTM Life Time Achievement Award.
In 1991, she became the first Pakistani singer to sing at the Royal Albert Hall London.
In 1996,she received Sitara-e-Imtiaz.
In 1998, she received PTV Life Time Achievement Award.
In 1999, she received Millennium Award for her services to Pakistani Cinema.
In January 2000, Pakistan Television PTV gave her the title of Voice of Century.
In 2002, she received First Lux Life Time Achievement Award.
In August 2014, she was declared as the Greatest Female Singer Of Pakistan of all times.
In August 2017, she was ranked at the top of Female Pakistani Singers.
She also retained the designation Cultural Ambassador of Pakistan.
On 21 September 2017, Google Doodle commemorated her 91st birthday.

Filmography

Films

In popular culture 
 In Pakistani film, Manto the role of Jehan was played by Saba Qamar.
 In 2022, Pakistani television actress Ayeza Khan tribute to Jehan by adapting her look in TV drama Laapata.

References

External links
 , Retrieved 16 November 2017
 
 

Pakistani film actresses
Radio personalities from Lahore
Pakistani film directors
Pakistani television personalities
Pakistani playback singers
Punjabi people
Punjabi women
1926 births
20th-century Khyal singers
Singers from Lahore
2000 deaths
Pakistani ghazal singers
20th-century Indian singers
Sindhi playback singers
Pakistani women singers
20th-century Indian women singers
PTV Award winners
Indian film actresses
Punjabi-language singers
Actresses in Urdu cinema
20th-century Indian classical singers
Recipients of the Pride of Performance
Urdu-language singers
Recipients of Tamgha-e-Imtiaz
Pakistani women composers
Hindi-language singers
Actresses in Punjabi cinema
20th-century Indian women musicians
Pakistani film score composers
Muhajir people
Recipients of Sitara-i-Imtiaz
Nigar Award winners
Pakistani composers
Pakistani classical singers
Women ghazal singers
Pakistani women film directors
People from British India
20th-century Indian women classical singers
People from Kasur District
20th-century classical composers
Actresses in Hindi cinema
20th-century Pakistani actresses
20th-century women composers
20th-century Indian actresses
Lux Style Award winners
Pakistani musicians
Sindhi-language singers
20th-century Pakistani women singers
Pakistani qawwali singers
Urdu playback singers
Urdu-language film directors
Pakistani radio personalities